John Ray Sinnock (July 8, 1888 – May 14, 1947) was the eighth Chief Engraver of the United States Mint from 1925 to 1947.

History
Sinnock was the designer of the Roosevelt dime and Franklin half dollar, among other U.S. coins. His initials can be found at the base of the Roosevelt and Franklin busts. He also sculpted, although did not design, the second (and current) form of the Distinguished Service Cross, the Purple Heart medal, the Yangtze Service Medal, and various other medals and commemorative coins.

Sinnock was born July 8, 1888, in Raton, New Mexico, and was educated at the Philadelphia Museum School of Industrial Art. He won the A.W. Mifflin Award for study abroad. Sinnock was well-traveled. His longtime confidante was Margaret Campbell, who inherited much of his artwork as well as his personal collection of materials related to the development of the Roosevelt Dime.

For ten years, Sinnock was an art instructor at both his alma mater and at Western Reserve University. He was appointed Assistant Engraver and Medallist at the Philadelphia Mint in 1917 before becoming the Chief Engraver in 1925.

Controversies
Upon the initial minting of the Roosevelt dime in 1946, a false narrative arose in the United States that the letters "JS" actually stood not for John Sinnock, but for Joseph Stalin. The urban folk story coincided with the Second Red Scare. The rumor surfaced again after the release of the Sinnock designed Franklin half dollar in 1948.

Another controversy that surrounded the Roosevelt dime following its public release was an allegation that Sinnock copied or borrowed the design of the President's profile from a bronze bas relief created by sculptor Selma H. Burke for the dime's obverse. Sinnock denied this claim and said that the obverse portrait of the President was a composite of two studies that he made from life in 1933 and 1934. Sinnock said that he also consulted photographs of FDR and had the advice and criticism of two prominent sculptors who specialize in work in relief.

See also
Merchant Marine World War II Victory Medal

References

External links
John R. Sinnock bio at askart.com
John R. Sinnock: Chief Engraver - Biography at usacoinbook.com

1888 births
1947 deaths
People from Raton, New Mexico
United States Mint engravers
University of the Arts (Philadelphia) alumni
University of the Arts (Philadelphia) faculty
Case Western Reserve University faculty